Ruthven may refer to:

Places

Scotland
 Ruthven, Aberdeenshire, a village
 Ruthven, Angus, a village
 Ruthven Castle, Angus
 Ruthven, Badenoch, Highland
 Ruthven Barracks, Highland
 Ruthven Castle (disambiguation) 
 Loch Ruthven, nature reserve to the south west of Inverness
 Aberuthven, a village in Perth and Kinross

Australia
 Ruthven Mansions, heritage-listed building in Adelaide, South Australia
 Ruthven railway station, Melbourne, Victoria
 Ruthven, New South Wales, an area in the City of Lismore

Elsewhere
 Ruthven, Iowa, US
 Ruthven, part of Kingsville, Ontario, Canada
 Ruthven Bluff, Antarctica

People
 Clan Ruthven, a Scottish clan
 Baron Ruthven of Gowrie, a title in the Peerage of the United Kingdom
 Lord Ruthven (disambiguation), a title in the peerage of Scotland and several people

Surname
 Alexander Ruthven (1580–1600), Scottish nobleman
 Alexander Grant Ruthven (1882–1971), American herpetologist and President of the University of Michigan
 Allan Ruthven (1922–2003), Australian rules footballer
 David Ruthven, 2nd Lord Ruthven of Freeland (died 1701), Lord High Treasurer of Scotland
 Dick Ruthven (born 1951), American baseball player
 Edward Southwell Ruthven  (c. 1772–1836), Irish Repealer politician and British MP
 Grey Ruthven, 2nd Earl of Gowrie (1939–2021), known as Grey Gowrie, British politician
 John Ruthven (disambiguation), several people
 Lady Jane Ruthven (died 1668), Swedish lady in waiting of Scottish descent to queen Christina of Sweden
 Malise Ruthven (born 1942), Scottish writer and historian
 Michelle Ruthven (born 1967), Canadian alpine skier
 Patrick Ruthven (disambiguation), several people
 Thomas Ruthven, 1st Lord Ruthven of Freeland (died 1671), Scottish nobleman
 Tyler Ruthven (born 1988), American soccer player
 William Ruthven (disambiguation), several people

Given name
 Ruthven Frederic Ruthven-Smith, London investor who funded Ruthven Mansions in Adelaide, South Australia
 Ruthven Todd (1914–1978), Scottish poet, artist and novelist
 Ruthven Wade (1920–2001), Royal Air Force officer, Vice-Chief of the Air Staff

Fictional characters
 Lord Ruthven (vampire), a fictional vampire character
 Sir Ruthven Murgatroyd, the male lead in the Gilbert and Sullivan operetta Ruddigore

See also
 Raid of Ruthven, a 1582 political conspiracy in Scotland
 Rathven, a village in Moray, Scotland
 Ruthven Road railway station, a station in Perthshire, Scotland which served Ruthven House between 1859 and 1951